This is a list of Sinhala words of Dutch origin.

Note: For information on the transcription used, see National Library at Calcutta romanization. An exception from the standard is the romanization of Sinhala long "ä" as "ää".

Sinhala words of Dutch origin came about during the period of Dutch colonial rule in Sri Lanka between 1658 and 1798. This period saw absorption of several Dutch words into the local language brought about by the interaction between Dutch colonials and the Sinhalese people, mainly in the coastal areas of the island. The Dutch replaced the Portuguese as the catalyst of change with regards to the social and cultural life of the people. A wide variety of words were adopted from administrative terms to military terms, which reveals several points of contact between the two groups.

Types of loanwords
Borrowings
The words pertaining to the fields of daily life, administration, food and military are the most numerous; this is to be expected because of many new innovations and goods that reached Sri Lanka via the Dutch.

The borrowing process
Dutch loanwords in Sinhala rarely appear in the same form as the original word. Usually, a word has undergone some kind of modification to fit into the Sinhala phonological or morphological system (e.g. balk becomes bālkaya because Sinhala inanimate nouns (see grammatical gender) need to end with /a/, in order to be declineable).

These are the main ways Dutch words are incorporated into the Sinhala lexicon with different endings:
With an /aya/ or /uva/ added to Dutch words ending in consonants (e.g. raam > rāmuva).
With a /ya/ added to words ending in /a/ or /e/ or /i/ (e.g. bakje > bakkiya).
With the animate ending /yā/ added to Dutch words signifying living beings or (e.g. tolk > tōlkayā).
Initial /s/ preceding a consonant usually forms an additional syllable (e.g. school > iskōlaya).

Nouns and Adjectives

Verbs

See also
 English loanwords in Sinhala
 Portuguese loanwords in Sinhala
 Tamil loanwords in Sinhala

References

Sinhala
Sri Lanka-related lists
Lists of Sinhala words of foreign origin
Dutch language in Asia